Paresh Narendra Kamat is a Konkani poet from Marcaim, Goa, India.

Kamat was born on 28 March 1968. He is a pharmacist and has been writing modern Konkani poetry for thirty years. His sensuous poetry is considered pioneering. He has published five poetry collections including Alang (2000), Garbhakol (2004), Shubhankar (2009), Chitralipi (2013) and Rangboli (2018).  His poetry has also been translated in many other languages.

He was awarded the Sahitya Academy Award in Konkani for Chitralipi in 2018. He has also received State Kala Academy’s Sahitya Puraskar (2009) and the Government of Goa's Yuva Srujan Puraskar (2011–12).

References

Recipients of the Sahitya Akademi Award in Konkani
Konkani-language poets
Indian poets
Living people
People from Goa
1968 births